is a Japanese voice actress who is affiliated with Arts Vision. She was formerly a member of Aoni Production and Production Baobab.

Personal life
Her hobbies involve dancing, playing the guitar, drawing still-life pictures and loves writing poems. She has an ability that she is very skilled with, and that is learning the Mandarin Chinese language.

Voice roles

Anime television series
Beyblade: V-Force – Boy B (Episode 3); Classmate I (Episode 2); Jim; Pupil B (Episode 5); Youth 1 (Episode 1)
The Beast Player Erin – Panshe
Love Get Chu – Bully A
Naruto – Matsuri, Leaf Ninja Student (Episode 56)
Queen's Blade – Woman Wrestler
Sergeant Frog – Aunt
Ultimate Muscle – Kaori (Episodes 13-14)

Anime films
Yatterman – Hitomi Takada

Games
Bouken Jidai Katsugeki Goemon – Goemon

Dubbing Roles

Television Animation
Franny's Feet – Johnny
My Gym Partner's a Monkey – Adam Lyon
Star Wars: The Clone Wars – Chalice

Live Action Television
Without a Trace – Additional Japanese dubbing voice
hentai

Live Action Films
Bring It On – Justin Shipman (Cody McMains)
College Road Trip – Nancy Carter (Brenda Song)
Lakeview Terrace – Marcus Turner (Jaishon Fisher)
The Santa Clause 3: The Escape Clause – Additional Japanese dubbing voice

References

External links
 Official blog 
 Official agency profile 
 
 
  

Year of birth missing (living people)
Living people
People from Amagasaki
Voice actresses from Hyōgo Prefecture
Japanese video game actresses
Japanese voice actresses
21st-century Japanese actresses
Aoni Production voice actors
Arts Vision voice actors
Production Baobab voice actors